Luke Geissbühler is an American cinematographer and producer. He is best known for his work on Borat, Borat Subsequent Moviefilm, Fahrenheit 11/9, Helvetica, Netflix’s Abstract: The Art of Design, and his work with OkGo.

Life and career 
Luke Geissbühler, son of renowned graphic designer Steff Geissbühler, was born in Philadelphia, Pennsylvania and currently lives in Brooklyn, New York. He graduated from New York University's Tisch School of the Arts with a BFA in Film and Television. He has received an Academy Award nomination for his work as cinematographer and producer on the short film, Time Freak, as well as receiving an Emmy Award for Street Gang, HBO's 2021 documentary about the beginnings of Sesame Street. In 2010, Geissbühler built a homemade spacecraft with his son Max that quietly recorded a trip through the blackness of space and returned safely back to earth, as chronicled in the viral video, Space Balloon.

Selected filmography

Film
 Acts of Worship (2001)
 Mail Order Wife (2004)
 Borat (2006)
 The Virginity Hit (2010)
 The Speed of Thought (2011)
 Sun Belt Express (2014)
 Bad Johnson (2014)
 Match (2014)
 Chloe and Theo (2015)
 Stuck (2017)
 Breaking Brooklyn (2018)
 Time Freak (2018)
 Borat Subsequent Moviefilm (2020)
 Robots (2022)
 Group (2023)

Documentary
 Helvetica (2007)
 Objectified (2009)
 Love Etc. (2010)
 Urbanized (2011)
 Buck (2011)
 A Lego Brickumentary (2014)
 Fahrenheit 11/9 (2018)
 Street Gang: How We Got to Sesame Street (2021)

Television

 Alchemy (2005)
 Bearing Witness (2005)
 A Muppets Christmas: Letters to Santa (2008)
 Newsreaders (2012)
 Bruce Springsteen: In His Own Words (2016)
 Abstract: The Art of Design (2017)
 Who Is America? (2018)
 Elvis Presley: The Searcher (2018)
 Conversations with a Killer: The Jeffrey Dahmer Tapes (2022)
 Who Killed Robert Wone? (2023)

References

External links 

1970 births
Living people
American cinematographers